CITIC Trust Co., Ltd. is a Chinese investment management company, with license to create private equity fund (as trust). The company was a subsidiary of CITIC Group. However, after a reverse takeover, CITIC Limited became the parent company for 100% stake (via CITIC Corporation Limited and CITIC Industrial Investment Group Corporation Limited).

History
CITIC Industrial Trust Investment Corporation was founded on 1 March 1988 as a subsidiary of CITIC Group (formerly China International Trust Investment Corporation). In 2002 CITIC Trust acquired the trust business from the parent company and renamed to CITIC Trust Investment Co., Ltd.. In 2006 CITIC Capital, another subsidiary of CITIC Group, had also acquired 20% stake of the company, which was re-acquired by CITIC Group.

Shareholders
CITIC Trust was wholly owned by CITIC Group (and later CITIC Limited).

In 2012 CITIC Group incorporated a subsidiary "CITIC Corporation Limited", and the stake of CITIC Trust (80%) was transferred to the subsidiary. However, the initial public offering of CITIC Corporation Limited was abandoned; It was takeover by CITIC Pacific, another subsidiary of CITIC Group in 2014 as a reverse IPO; the Chinese name of CITIC Corporation Limited had also dropped the word "shares".

In 2012 also saw another direct shareholder of CITIC Trust for 20% stake, Shanghai-based "CITIC East China (Group) Corporation Limited" was renamed to CITIC Industrial Investment Group Corporation Limited; The stake of CITIC Industrial Investment Group had also transferred to CITIC Corporation Limited, making CITIC Corporation Limited owned 80% stake of CITIC Trust directly and 20% indirectly.

Joint ventures
CITIC Trust formed a joint venture with China Guodian Corporation. The joint venture was an in-house investment management company for Guodian. The joint venture raised money from the general public to invest in Guodian's projects.

Equity investments
CITIC Trust was an investor in Otis Elevator (China) Investment from 1998 to 2001. In 2001 the 3% stake was sold back to Otis Far East Holdings.

CITIC Trust was a shareholder of China Guangfa Bank in 2006 for 20% shares.

References

External links
  

CITIC Group
Government-owned companies of China
Companies based in Beijing
Chinese companies established in 1988
Privatization in China
Financial services companies of China
Investment management companies of China
Private equity firms of China